Kolayat railway station is a railway station in Bikaner district, Rajasthan. Its code is KLYT. It serves Kolayat town. The station consists of 2 platforms. Passenger, express, and superfast trains halt here.

Trains

The following trains halt at Kolayat railway station in both directions:

 Leelan Express
 Jaisalmer–Lalgarh Express
 Bhavnagar Terminus–Udhampur Janmabhoomi Express

References

Railway stations in Bikaner district
Bikaner railway division